UNITE (Undergraduate Nano Ionospheric Temperature Explorer) was a CubeSat nanosatellite developed by the University of Southern Indiana. The project was funded by NASA's Undergraduate Student Instrument Project and primarily designed and built by students. It was launched into space on 5 December 2018 and deployed into its orbit from the International Space Station on 31 January 2019. Its mission included measuring plasma in the lower ionosphere and monitoring the drag and temperature of the satellite itself.

UNITE reentered the atmosphere on 21 October 2021, after 994 days in orbit.

References

External links
 Official site

Satellites deployed from the International Space Station
Spacecraft launched in 2018
Spacecraft which reentered in 2021
Student satellites
Nanosatellites
CubeSats